This is a list of diplomatic missions of Tonga. Tonga is a small island kingdom in Polynesia.  About half of its 200,000 citizens live abroad (chiefly in New Zealand, Australia and the United States, and also as merchant seamen), and the portion of its national income derived through expatriate remittances is one of the highest in the world.  However, except for a few honorary consulates Tonga's diplomatic network is very limited.  It does not even have a mission on any neighbouring Pacific island states.

Americas

 Burlingame, California (Consulate-General)

Asia

 Beijing (Embassy)

 Tokyo (Embassy)

 Abu Dhabi (Embassy)

Europe

 London (High Commission)

Oceania

 Canberra (High Commission)

 Auckland (Consulate-General)

Multilateral Organizations

New York City (Permanent Mission)

Gallery

See also
 Foreign relations of Tonga
 List of diplomatic missions in Tonga

References

External links
 Government of Tonga
 Tonga Diplomatic Missions

Diplomatic Missions of Tonga
Tonga
Diplomatic missions